Adiposphaerion is a genus of longhorn beetles in the tribe Elaphidiini, containing a single species, Adiposphaerion rubrum, described my Martins and Napp in 1992. It is endemic to Bélizon, French Guiana and has a red body with black legs and antennae.

References

Elaphidiini
Beetles described in 1992
Monotypic Cerambycidae genera